Fabrice Divert (born 9 February 1967) is a French former footballer who played as a striker.

Football career
Divert was born in Caen, Calvados. During his career, he played mainly for SM Caen and Montpellier HSC, scoring prolifically for both. On 20 May 1989, as home side Girondins de Bordeaux led 2–0 at half-time in the final day of the season, he scored a hat-trick that saved Caen from relegation. At the end of his tenure (having made his professional debuts at 16), he was first summoned by France, for a friendly in Hungary, on 28 March 1990, being then selected for UEFA Euro 1992, where he did not play.

During 1994–95, with Montpellier, Divert suffered a serious foot injury, from which he never recovered again. On loan to En Avant de Guingamp the following season, he still netted the league opener for the club, but only appeared in another four matches. He retired at only 29.

Since 2005, Divert acted as player/president of amateur side AS Verson.

References

External links
 

1967 births
Living people
Footballers from Caen
French footballers
Association football forwards
Ligue 1 players
Ligue 2 players
Stade Malherbe Caen players
Montpellier HSC players
En Avant Guingamp players
France international footballers
UEFA Euro 1992 players